Zygaspis ferox is a worm lizard species in the family Amphisbaenidae. It is endemic to Zimbabwe.

References

Zygaspis
Reptiles of Zimbabwe
Endemic fauna of Zimbabwe
Reptiles described in 1997
Taxa named by Donald George Broadley
Taxa named by Sheila Broadley
Fauna of the Eastern Highlands